Afon Lloer is a small river in Snowdonia in north-west Wales. It is the outflow from Ffynnon Lloer, a lake in the Carneddau mountains, and it flows into Llyn Ogwen.

External links
 Natural Resources Wales: The Importance of Watercourses for Lichens in Eryri SSSIs (pdf) - Afon Lloer pp.122-125 
 ComeWalkWithMe.co.uk: Afon Lloer

Capel Curig
Rivers of Conwy County Borough
Rivers of Snowdonia